Winterrieden is a municipality in the district of Unterallgäu in Bavaria, Germany. The municipality has a municipal association with Babenhausen.

References

Unterallgäu